Bobby E. Lüthge (12 September 1891 – 12 March 1964) was a German screenwriter.

Selected filmography

 The Ocarina (1919)
 Mary Magdalene (1920)
 Catherine the Great (1920)
 The Girl from Acker Street (1920)
 The Island of the Lost (1921)
 The Poisoned Stream (1921)
 Treasure of the Aztecs (1921)
 Fridericus Rex (1922)
 Black Monday (1922)
 Christian Wahnschaffe (1920)
 The Young Man from the Ragtrade (1926)
 We'll Meet Again in the Heimat (1926)
 The Third Squadron (1926)
 Her Husband's Wife (1926)
 The Sporck Battalion (1927)
 The Woman with the World Record (1927)
 The Woman in the Cupboard (1927)
 The Bordello in Rio (1927)
 Modern Pirates (1928)
 Suzy Saxophone (1928)
 The Beloved of His Highness (1928)
 Sajenko the Soviet (1928)
 Spy of Madame Pompadour (1928)
 Docks of Hamburg (1928)
 The League of Three (1929)
 Revolt in the Batchelor's House (1929)
 Waterloo (1929)
 The Green Monocle (1929)
 Rooms to Let (1930)
 Three Days Confined to Barracks (1930)
 Moritz Makes his Fortune (1931)
 Marriage with Limited Liability (1931)
 The Night Without Pause (1931)
 The Fate of Renate Langen (1931)
 Duty is Duty (1931)
 Terror of the Garrison (1931)
Peace of Mind (1931)
 Road to Rio (1931)
 Scandal on Park Street (1932)
 Modern Dowry (1932)
 The Heath Is Green (1932)
 The Ladies Diplomat (1932)
 Two Good Comrades (1933)
 Bon Voyage (1933)
 The Gentleman from Maxim's (1933)
 The House of Dora Green (1933)
 The Peak Scaler (1933)
 Hitlerjunge Quex (1933)
 Paprika (1933)
 Miss Liselott (1934)
 The Sporck Battalion (1934)
 The Csardas Princess (1934)
 The Valiant Navigator (1935)
 Make Me Happy (1935)
 The Violet of Potsdamer Platz (1936)
 Adventure in Warsaw (1937)
 A Diplomatic Wife (1937)
 Seven Slaps (1937)
 The Barber of Seville (1938)
 Wibbel the Tailor (1939)
 I Entrust My Wife to You (1943)
 I'll Never Forget That Night (1949)
 Nights on the Nile (1949)
 One Night Apart (1950)
 The Black Forest Girl (1950)
 The Heath Is Green (1951)
 The Csardas Princess (1951)
 Dark Eyes (1951)
 Pension Schöller (1952)
 At the Well in Front of the Gate (1952)
 Mikosch Comes In (1952)
 The Chaste Libertine (1952)
 The Prince of Pappenheim (1952)
 Red Roses, Red Lips, Red Wine (1953)
 The Great Lola (1954)
 Your Life Guards (1955)
 Three Girls from the Rhine (1955)
 My Aunt, Your Aunt (1956)
  (1957)

Bibliography
 Davidson, John E & Hake, Sabina. Take Two: Fifties Cinema in Divided Germany. Berghahn Books, 2007.

External links

1891 births
1964 deaths
German male screenwriters
People from Gliwice
People from the Province of Silesia
German male writers
20th-century German screenwriters